Christopher Smith may refer to:

People
Christopher Smith (MP) (died by 1589)
Christopher Webb Smith (1793–1871), English-born bird painter and public official
Christopher Smith (died 1835), English Lord Mayor of London and Member of Parliament
Christopher Arthur Smith (1892–1952), South Australian architect
Christopher Neil-Smith (1920–1995), Anglican exorcist
Christopher Llewellyn Smith (born 1942), British physicist
Christopher Smith (performer) (born 1959), American actor, director and improviser
Christopher Corey Smith (born 1962), American voice actor
Christopher N. Smith (born 1964), American attorney at law and foreign consul
Christopher Smith (classicist) (born 1965), ancient historian, Director of the British School at Rome
Christopher Smith (director) (born 1970), British film director
Christopher William Smith (born 1980), American e-mail spammer
Christopher Smith (English actor) (born 1984), English actor
Christopher Smith II (born 2000), American football player
Christopher Smith (linebacker) (born 1988), Canadian football linebacker
Christopher Bjorn Smith Jr. (born 1991), American rapper and singer
Christopher Nicholas Smith, American film and TV actor
Christopher Allan Smith, drummer with The Internet
Chris Smith (New Jersey politician), US congressman

Fictional characters
Peacemaker (comics), superhero from DC Universe, real name Christopher Smith
Peacemaker (DC Extended Universe character), the film adaptation of the character portrayed by John Cena
A character in The Spoils of Babylon and The Spoils Before Dying

See also
Chris Smith (disambiguation)
Christian Smith (disambiguation)
Christine Smith (disambiguation)
Christina Smith (disambiguation)